Ramaa: The Saviour is a 2010 Indian fantasy action adventure film produced by Paul London, written by Reshu Nath and directed by Hadi Ali Abrar. The film stars Sahil Khan, Dalip Singh Rana and Tanushree Dutta.

Synopsis 
Snobbish Komal and her brother, Kunal ; Sameer – who is always ready for a snack; and siblings of smart class monitor Riddhi, Rohan and Sanj (Zankhi Pabari) – participate in a dance competition whose winner will be given the recently released video game "The Last Battle". They win the competition and are sent to the game room for playing the game. But when they start playing the game, they get sucked into the game and are stranded on a vast prehistoric island. They also fend for themselves against wild animals, deadly gem-seekers all by themselves until a wild-type man called Ramaa gives them food and shelter in his hut in the jungle and also starts helping them to get out of the island by building a small boat for them. Shortly problems arise when Kunal is kidnapped by Kali, who is on the lookout for the power to rule the world with the help of three stones controlling the mind, body, and soul.

Cast 
 Sahil Khan as Ramaa 
 Tanushree Dutta as Samara
 Dalip Singh Rana as Vali
 Meghan Jadhav as Rohan
 Ananya Shukla as Komal
 Ishita Panchal as Ridhi
 Arjun Nandwani as Sameer
 Koustuv Ghosh as Kunal
 Zankhi Pabari as Sanjh

Soundtrack
The music was composed by Siddharth-Suhas and released by Sony Music India.

References

External links
 
 

2010s Hindi-language films
Indian fantasy action films
Indian fantasy adventure films
2010s fantasy adventure films